Lost to the Living is the title of the third full-length album by Daylight Dies and was to be released by Candlelight Records on June 24, 2008, but was delayed until July 14, 2008 due to problems with printing the album.

Track listing

Credits
Nathan Ellis – harsh vocals
Barre Gambling – guitars
Charley Shackelford – guitars
Egan O'Rourke – bass, clean vocals, engineer
Jesse Haff – drums

Session musicians

Matthew Golombisky & Tomorrow Music Orchestra – strings, woodwinds

Production
Jens Bogren – mixing, mastering
Travis Smith – layout

References

2008 albums
Candlelight Records albums
Daylight Dies albums